The 1949 Jacksonville State Gamecocks football team represented Jacksonville State Teachers College (now known as Jacksonville State University) as a member of the Alabama Intercollegiate Conference (AIC) during the 1949 college football season. Led by fourth-year head coach Don Salls, the Gamecocks compiled an overall record of 6–3 with a mark of 3–2 in conference play, placing third in the AIC.

Schedule

References

Jacksonville State
Jacksonville State Gamecocks football seasons
Jacksonville State Gamecocks football